Talia al Ghul is a fictional character appearing in American comic books published by DC Comics, commonly in association with Batman. The character was created by writer Dennis O'Neil and artist Bob Brown, and first appeared in Detective Comics #411 (May 1971). Talia is most commonly known as being the daughter of the supervillain Ra's al Ghul as well as the on-and-off lover of the superhero Batman and the mother of their son Damian Wayne (the fifth Robin) who was born during a brief marriage. Over the years, she has alternately been depicted as an anti-heroine who is constantly torn between being an ally and an enemy of Batman due to her loyalty to both him and her environmentalist father, with whom she shares the same vision when it comes to saving the planet and nature, but not the means he uses to achieve that goal.

Talia has appeared in over 700 individual comics issues, and has been featured in various media adaptations. The character was voiced by Helen Slater and Olivia Hussey in the DC Animated Universe, which became her first appearances in media other than comic books. The character was subsequently portrayed by Marion Cotillard in the 2012 film The Dark Knight Rises and by Lexa Doig in the Arrowverse television series Arrow.

Publication history
The character was created by the writer Dennis O'Neil and artist Bob Brown as simply Talia originally. The character's creation and depiction was inspired by other works of fiction, such as the 1969 James Bond film On Her Majesty's Secret Service, and the Fu Manchu fiction. The character first appeared in Detective Comics #411 (May 1971). She is most commonly depicted as a romantic interest for Batman, a villain, or a combination of the two. Her father, the leader of a worldwide criminal and terrorist empire, considered Batman the man most worthy to marry Talia and become his successor. Absent a spouse, Talia was considered as an heir to her father and his organization. While Batman is uninterested in the criminal empire, he has often demonstrated romantic feelings for Talia.

Talia has saved the life of Batman or helped him on numerous occasions. The majority of her criminal acts have been committed at the behest of her father and motivated by loyalty to her father rather than personal gain. She had been depicted as morally ambiguous or an antiheroic figure. In the mid to late 1990s part of her father's name was incorporated to hers as a kind of surname to help readers associate her with Ra's al Ghul. Recent depictions have shown her to be more often an enemy of Batman and a supervillain in her own right, such as leading the League of Assassins, as part of the Secret Society of Super Villains, and as the mastermind behind Leviathan.

IGN's list of the Top 100 Comic Book Villains of All Time List ranked Talia as #42. She was ranked 25th in Comics Buyer's Guide's "100 Sexiest Women in Comics" list.

Fictional character biography

Early years
The first Talia comic story appears in "Into the Den of the Death-Dealers!" in Detective Comics #411 (May 1971), written by Dennis O'Neil. In the story, Batman rescues her from Dr. Darrk, apparently the leader of the League of Assassins. It is eventually revealed that the League is just one part of Ra's al Ghul's organization, The Demon, and that Darrk apparently turned against Ra's after failing in a mission (the usual punishment for this is death). At the end of the story, she shoots and kills Darrk to save Batman's life.

Talia next appears in "Daughter of the Demon" in Batman #232 (June 1971). In the story, Dick Grayson (Robin) is kidnapped. Ra's al Ghul enters the Batcave, revealing to Batman that he knows Batman's secret identity and saying that Talia was also kidnapped along with Dick. Batman then goes with Ra's to search for Dick and Talia; in the end, it is revealed that Talia loves Batman and that the entire kidnapping is a setup designed by Ra's as a final test of Batman's suitability to be Talia's husband and his successor. Though Batman rejects Ra's offer, he nevertheless returns Talia's feelings. Ra's and Talia consider Batman to be married to Talia with only their consent necessary in DC Special Series #15 (1978) in the story "I Now Pronounce You Batman and Wife!".

In the years since the character met Batman, Talia is repeatedly depicted as torn between her love for the Caped Crusader and her loyalty to her father. However, she has proven an important ally in her way; most prominently, she encourages Batman to return to Gotham City when it is declared a "No Man's Land" (1999) following an earthquake.

Son of the Demon
In the graphic novel Son of the Demon (1987) by Mike W. Barr, Ra's al Ghul successfully enlists Batman's aid in defeating a rogue assassin who had murdered his wife and Talia's mother, Melisande. Talia witnessed the murder as a young child. During this storyline, Batman marries Talia and the prior marriage from DC Special Series #15 (1978) is referenced. They have sex which results in her becoming pregnant. Batman is nearly killed protecting Talia from an attack by the assassin's agents. In retrospect, Talia concludes that she could never keep Batman, as he would be continuously forced to defend her, so she fakes a miscarriage, and the marriage is dissolved.

In later continuity, after Talia gives birth the child is left at an orphanage. He is adopted and given the name Ibn al Xu'ffasch which is Arabic for 'son of the bat'. The only other clue to the child's heritage is a jewel-encrusted necklace Batman had given to Talia which Talia leaves with the child.

It is referenced in three Elseworlds storylines: Kingdom Come, its sequel The Kingdom, and Brotherhood of the Bat feature two alternate versions of the child as an adult, coming to terms with his dual heritage.

Birth of the Demon
The graphic novel Batman: Birth of the Demon (1992) by Dennis O'Neil explains how her father met her mother at Woodstock, New York. Talia's mother is confirmed deceased of a drug overdose in this story. This introduction of Talia's mother in particular, (as well as Talia al Ghul's origin) is revised and further elaborated in Batman, Incorporated #2 (2012) by Grant Morrison and Chris Burnham.

Bane

After Bane enters the League of Assassins, Ra's considers Bane a potential heir to his empire instead of Batman and wants his daughter to marry him. Talia later rejects the brute, regarding him as merely a cunning animal compared to the more cultured intelligence of his predecessor. After Batman defeats Bane in the Legacy comic series (1996), Ra's agrees that Bane was unworthy of his daughter (Detective Comics #701 and Robin #33), and calls off their engagement. Following Legacy, Bane has a nightmare in Batman: Bane (1997) of Talia (presumed to be deceased) betraying him and stabbing him and then embracing Batman. In Birds of Prey #26 (2001), written by Dixon, Bane continues to express his obsession with Talia. At the end of the story, Talia is pleased with the supposed death of Bane in one of her father's underground sanctums.

LexCorp
The Talia character was written to begin a new phase of her fictional life near the turn of the century. Talia, disillusioned with her father and his plans and using the name Talia Head for herself, leaves him to run LexCorp as its new CEO when Lex Luthor becomes President of the United States. Although she seemingly supports Luthor, she secretly works to undermine him, anonymously leaking news of his underhanded dealings to Superman. In Superman/Batman #6 (March 2004), when the time comes for Luthor's downfall, she sells all of LexCorp's assets to the Wayne Foundation, leaving Luthor penniless and his crimes exposed to all.

Death and the Maidens
In Batman: Death and the Maidens (2003) written by Greg Rucka, it is revealed that Ra's al Ghul met a woman by whom he had a daughter named Nyssa during his travels in Russia in the 20th century. Ra's abandons Nyssa at a crucial time: she is tortured, her entire family is killed in a concentration camp during the Holocaust, and she is rendered sterile when Nazi doctors pour acid into her uterus. Seeking vengeance, Nyssa plans to use her considerable wealth and resources to kill Ra's by befriending, kidnapping, and brainwashing Talia, turning her into a weapon to kill their father. To this end, she captures Talia and kills and resurrects her in rapid succession in a Lazarus Pit, leaving Talia virtually broken from the trauma of dying again and again in so short a time as Nyssa asks Talia why her father is 'letting' this happen to her. Rendered apathetic by her time in the camp, unable to feel anything, Nyssa also plans to assassinate Superman with Kryptonite bullets she stole from the Batcave, hoping that, by uniting the world in one moment of tragedy, she would manage to rouse herself once more.

While Batman is successful in preventing the assassination of Superman, he is unable to stop Nyssa from killing Ra's. This, in turn, is actually part of a greater plan concocted by Ra's, who wants to ensure that his daughters would accept their destinies as his heirs and take up his genocidal campaign. Realizing and accepting this, Nyssa and Talia become the heads of The Demon, with Talia disavowing her love for Bruce Wayne as another result of her torture at Nyssa's hands (both sisters then consider Batman to be their enemy). Talia from then on became more often Batman's enemy than an ally.

The Society
In Countdown to Infinite Crisis, it is revealed that Talia is one of the core members of the Secret Society of Super Villains (the others were Lex Luthor (secretly Alexander Luthor, Jr. in disguise), Black Adam, Doctor Psycho, Deathstroke, and Calculator). This is revealed to be part of one of half-sister Nyssa's plans to take over the planet and bring about world peace and equality. After Nyssa is killed by Batgirl Cassandra Cain, Talia assumes leadership of the League.

Under the Hood and Red Hood: The Lost Days

During the "Death in the Family" (1988) storyline, Jason Todd, the second Robin, is murdered by the Joker in Ethiopia. He was later revived as a character, and in Under the Hood (2005), he is discovered by the League of Assassins. In "Lost Days", out of her love for Batman, Talia takes Jason to her father and Jason spends months in the care of the League of Assassins. Although his body recuperates, Jason's mind is shattered.

Seeing no other way to help him, Talia takes Jason down to the Lazarus Pit and throws his body in while her father regenerates himself. Jason is fully revived in the body and mind. Immediately afterward, to spare Jason her father's wrath, she aids the boy's escape.

Livid at the fact that Batman failed to avenge his (Jason's) death by killing the Joker and that Batman had done nothing more than imprison him again, Jason pursues his own brand of justice. To stall him from killing Batman, Talia agrees to finance Jason and aid him in his training, so that he can then become the second Red Hood.

In September 2011, The New 52 rebooted DC's continuity. In this new timeline, this story was changed, whereby Red Hood and the Outlaws #2 (2011) shows that, shortly after Jason Todd's return from the dead, Talia al Ghul, out of her love for Batman, takes him to a secret cult of warrior monks called the All Caste to train in becoming a skilled assassin.

Batman and Son

The concept of Talia and Batman having a child from Son of the Demon is reinterpreted into continuity in the story Batman and Son (2006), written by Grant Morrison. Their son is grown in an artificial womb and named Damian. He is raised and trained in the League of Assassins. Talia introduces him to Batman as part of a grand scheme involving ninja Man-Bats and the kidnapping of the British Prime Minister's wife. Morrison admitted that they relied on their shaky memories of Son of the Demon before writing, so they "messed up a lot of the details" such as changing the consensual marriage between Talia and Batman that ended after she faked a miscarriage to her drugging and raping him to have his child without his knowledge. Morrison's mistake would later be retconned in later comic books, citing Batman and Talia's tryst as consensual.

R.I.P. and Final Crisis
During the Batman R.I.P. storyline, Talia and Damian become aware of the Black Glove's plot against Batman and begins devising a plan to help save him. They arrive at Wayne Manor just in time to save Commissioner James Gordon from being killed by assorted booby traps created by the Black Glove. This is referenced in issue 39 of the old 52. She offers to join forces with Gordon to save Batman. She and Gordon arrive too late, however, and are informed by Robin that Batman went missing and maybe dead following a battle with Doctor Hurt.

Furious that her love may be dead, she sends out her ninja Man-Bats to murder Jezebel Jet, who plays a major role in trying to kill Batman. Soon after it is revealed Batman did not die, but survives only to be captured by Darkseid during the "Final Crisis" and then apparently murdered by the New God.

Following Batman's apparent death, Talia apparently decides to leave Damian in the hands of his adoptive brother Dick Grayson, who later takes on the role of Batman, and selects Damian to succeed Tim Drake as Robin.

In Final Crisis, she is placed on the new Society's inner circle by Libra. Despite Talia's interaction with the new Society she still behaves lovingly and almost devoted to Batman.

It is revealed in Gotham City Sirens #2 that Talia has trained Selina Kyle to resist even the most intense psychological coercion to reveal Bruce Wayne's secret identity.

Following an operation in which Damian's spine is replaced, it is revealed that Talia inserts an implant into his spine that allows her or anyone she chooses, including Deathstroke, to control Damian's body remotely. She intends to use this device to force Damian to kill Dick Grayson, whom she perceives as holding her son back from his potential. After Grayson frees Damian, Talia reveal to her son that she has begun cloning him after realizing that the Boy Wonder has completely sided with his father's circle during their confrontation. She is too much of a perfectionist to love her son after he has defied her in such a manner, and is no longer welcome in the House of al Ghul.

The New 52

In 2011, "The New 52" rebooted the DC universe. In Batman Incorporated, written by Grant Morrison, Talia is revealed to be the mastermind behind the Leviathan, a shadowy organization formed to oppose Bruce's "Batman Incorporated" project. She places a bounty of US$500 million on Damian's head, and declares war on Batman. In Batman Incorporated Vol. 2, #2 (2012), a Talia origin issue, she puts her father, Ra's al Ghul, under house arrest for opposing her plan and takes his men away with her. She claims to Batman that her agents have infiltrated all of Gotham's infrastructure and that she is providing the poor with purpose by arming them and giving them slogans to chant, as well as an enemy to fight. Talia says Batman must choose between saving Gotham from suicide or saving their son Damian from a death sentence. Her clone of Damian, known as the Heretic, stabs Damian through the chest and delivers the killing stroke to her son, leaving Batman devastated.

After the Heretic loses his final confrontation with Batman, Talia kills him, destroys Wayne Tower, and challenges Batman to a duel to the death in the Batcave. There, Talia poisons Batman. He embraces and kisses her mid-battle, not knowing that her lips were covered with poison, and he apologizes for not being able to love her the way she wants and admits defeat. Talia asks Batman to beg for the antidote but he does not respond. Jason Todd arrives at the Batcave and offers Talia the Oroboro trigger, a device that would trigger the destruction of seven cities and that she claims would provide a new source of energy for the world. When she attempts to activate the device, Jason reveals that he has double-crossed her and that the weapons the device would trigger had already been disarmed. Talia is then shot and killed by Spyral agent Kathy Kane, buried, and her body later disappears from the gravesite along with that of Damian.

Morrison's writing of the Batman, Talia, and Damian saga drew from their own personal experience as a child of divorce. The end of Batman Incorporated marked the end of his seven-year run on the characters.

While Batman was preoccupied with a series of cases, Talia's body is taken from the grave by her father, Ra's, so that he may resurrect his daughter and his grandson, Damian, whose body was also taken. Batman continues his pursuit for Ra's and to reclaim his son's body. Ra's attempted to resurrect Talia alongside Damian in what he thought was a Lazarus Pit in the island of Themyscira, but instead Ra's discovered that it was a portal to a Netherworld in the Pit's former location, which both Wonder Woman and Batman already knew. Ra's flees with the bodies afterwards. Batman arrives too late, after Ra's has successfully had the bodies placed in a Lazarus Pit. The resurrections fail, leaving Ra's to realize his arrogance in allowing the Heretic to kill his grandson, and regret for allowing Talia to clone Damian.

After defeating Ra's in combat, as Batman intends to reclaim his son's body, their battle is disrupted by Darkseid's elite member Glorious Godfrey, as well as a number of Parademons. Batman is forced to team up with Ra's to battle Godfrey (who came to retrieve the Chaos Shard, a powerful crystal that once belonged to Darkseid, which Ra's had hidden in Damian's body) and the Parademons who had taken the bodies of Talia and Damian. Ra's manages to get his daughter's body from the Parademons in the sky, but falls into the gorge of Nanda Parbat along with Talia's body, while Batman tries to retrieve his son's body from Godfrey.

Following Damian's resurrection, Talia had emerged on Nanda Parbat with no memory of who she was. She kills a nearby Tibetan to eat their food.

Later, Talia was approached by a shadowy figure; she is able to recognize the robed figure and feared that a faction known as the Lu'un Darga is upon release, she is then knocked unconscious. The robed figure restores Talia's memory and attempts to influence her as a servant, but Talia resists his control and knocks him unconscious with stalagmites. She tries to escape the Lu'un Darga's unknown lair of the inner core with the heart of the Lazarus Pit. When Talia was reunited with her son in the Lu'un Darga's lair on al Ghul Island, Damian is aware of his quest about the Lu'un Darga. He doesn't wish to see Talia however and attacks her.

During their battle, Talia tries, unsuccessfully, to convince Damian that Ra's and his al Ghul family wage war against the ancient immortals of the Lu'un Darga, claiming to be guardians of the Lazarus Pit. While Ra's sought to bring power and balance of life to Earth, the Lu'un Darga then tried to take back all life and cleanse Earth entirely, because they would bring their own destruction to Earth and the heart of the Lazarus Pit. Talia also tells him he is being used as a pawn by Ra's to steal the Lu'un Darga's power. The mysterious robed figure was revealed to be Den Darga, who thanked Damian for inadvertently bringing the relic and attempts to bring about the end of life on Earth.

While Den Darga destroys al Ghul Island by sinking it, he attempts to cleanse Talia and Damian's souls. However, his clones protect Damian and sacrifice themselves to save his life. Den Darga flees, leaving Talia and Damian to the abyss; where they were rescued by Damian's friends. Afterward, Talia is hopeful that she and Damian can move to a safe place and tells her unconscious son to rest. When Damian wakes, Talia convinces her son to calm down. She explains that she had been finding redemption for herself, for her retribution against him and inaction after Den Darga's attack. She informs him that if he chooses vigilantism, it will corrupt him. Talia goes on to say that he, too, can choose between staying or leaving, after accepting who he is, except that his mother has been reforming herself and regrets her choices. As he chooses to leave and says goodbye to his mother, Talia rejoins the League of Assassins to prepare for war against Den Darga and the Lu'un Darga.

Talia, along with Batman, show up again later in the title to aid their son in saving all life on Earth from the threat of Den and the Lu'un Darga. They are portrayed as a bickering couple but also put things aside to help. Their mission is a success though Damian ends up giving his life to save humanity. He is later brought back to life by Suren Darga. With the world saved, and satisfied her son is safe, she goes to rejoin the League of Assassins.

DC Rebirth
During DC Rebirth, Talia al Ghul shows up for her son, Damian Wayne's birthday and warns him of Ra's al Ghul plot to send the Demon's Fist against Damian and the Teen Titans in a plan to assassinate them to prove their worth to the Demon's Head. These targets will later become Damian's Teen Titans teammates after he saves them and makes them aware of the Fist and their plans.

Shadow War 
After observing how happy both of his daughter and grandson are while living a peaceful life without killing, the now reformed Ra's al Ghul decides that he wants to turn himself in to the authority to atone for all the crimes he committed as well as publicly share all the secrets he kept hidden over the centuries, this decision has sparked a huge interest in both the superhero community and the villain community due the amount of knowledge the immortal Demon's Head has about the world, so all eyes were on him during a press conference he held before his incarceration. However, as soon as the conference started, Ra's was immediately shot by a sniper wearing a Deathstroke-looking costume, who also threw a bomb that turned his body to ashes to insure that there would be nothing left of him that can be resurrected through the Lazarus Pit.

This incident has deeply hurt both Damian and his mother, Talia, who had to watch her father get murdered even though he finally made the right choice for the first time in his life and was willing to turn a new leaf for his family's sake. In her grief, she gathered all the members of the League of Assassins and put a hit on Deathstroke as well as all of his associates in revenge for killing her father. On the other hand, Damian has teamed-up with his father, who wasn't fully convinced that it was the real Deathstroke that killed Ra's al Ghul, to investigate the murder and find out who was really behind it.

This event concludes with a war between The League of Assassins and Deathstroke Inc, which ends with Talia killing Slade in a one-on-one battle, but shortly afterward the Deathstroke imposter reveals himself to be Geo-Force, who plotted this whole war in hope of having both Slade and Talia killing each other. Damian and Bruce arrive shortly soon and help Talia defeat Geo-Force, with Damian managing to convince his mother to not kill Geo-Force afterward because his grandfather believed that their family could be better than this.

Powers and abilities
Talia has been written to be an athlete at the peak of physical conditioning and has been trained in many forms of martial arts. She was educated in the arts and sciences, and she holds advanced degrees in biology, engineering, and business as an MBA. She is also quite proficient with most hand weapons. Often underestimated, Talia is also an excellent hand-to-hand fighter.

Other versions
In Batman: Brotherhood of the Bat, Earth has been decimated by a plague unleashed by Ra's a decade or so before, prompting Ra's to claim Wayne Manor as his new base of operations; at this point, Bruce Wayne has been dead for some time under undisclosed circumstances, but Talia has been raising his son Tallant in secret. As Ra's transforms a group of his elite assassins into a 'Brotherhood of the Bat', using Batman's discarded costume designs to create a group of different Batmen, Talia decides that the time has come to tell Tallant of his father's heritage, with Tallant infiltrating the Brotherhood to dismantle it from within.

In Superman & Batman: Generations, Talia is present when Bruce Wayne enters a Lazarus Pit with her father in 1979; when two men enter the Pit simultaneously, one will perish while the other will become permanently immortal with no way to determine which will be the sacrifice. When Bruce Wayne emerges restored to full youth, he spends the next two decades turning the League of Assassin's front organizations into the true operation with Talia at his side, although the exact nature of their relationship is never explicitly confirmed.

In Elseworld's Finest, when Ra's and the League are searching for the lost city of Argos, they come into contact with another group of explorers; impoverished archaeologist Bruce Wayne, reporter Clark Kent, Kent's childhood friend Lana Lang, and newspaper-boy Jimmy Olsen. Witnessing Kent's exceptional strength, Ra's offers him Talia's hand in marriage, but although Kent is tempted by the offer, he chooses to escape with his friends to continue their search for Lana's abducted father. Later, after Ra's is killed when he attempts to claim the power of Argos for himself and Kent is left mortally wounded in a confrontation with Lex Luthor, Talia is able to use her father's Lazarus formula to restore Kent to life, expressing grief that she would never have the chance to see how their relationship would develop if this fails. The story concludes with an elderly Lana talking to a young woman named Kara, who is clearly intended to be the child of Clark Kent and Talia al Ghul.

In other media

Television

Animated
 Talia appears in Batman: The Brave and the Bold, voiced by Andrea Bowen. This version is still romantically involved with Batman, but is also implied to have a crush on Robin.
 Talia appears in Young Justice, voiced by Zehra Fazal.

DC Animated Universe

 Talia appears in the DC Animated Universe.
 Talia appears in Batman: The Animated Series, voiced by Helen Slater. Introduced in the episode "Off Balance", she is sent to go after Vertigo (her father's ex-servant) in Gotham City. When she and Batman are attacked and taken prisoner by the League of Shadows, Talia tends to Bruce Wayne's wounds. She proposes a temporary partnership with Batman, and they together defeat Vertigo. However, she double-crosses Batman to steal Vertigo's sonic weapon for her father. Talia eventually returns in the two-part episode "The Demon's Quest". When she and Dick Grayson are abducted, Batman and Ra's work together to rescue them. It is ultimately revealed that Ra's staged their kidnappings to test Batman's suitability as an heir and son-in-law. Talia later helps Batman defeat her father. In "Avatar", she helps Bruce go after Ra's to stop from a self-destructive bid for immortality. Ra's disowns Talia and attempts to kill her and Batman, having been aware of their mutual connection. Despite this, the couple saves Ra's when this quest for immortality threatens her father's life. When she sees that Batman intends to take Ra's to the authorities, Talia turns on the Dark Knight so that her father can escape.
 Talia appears in the Superman: The Animated Series episode "The Demon Reborn", now voiced by Olivia Hussey. She fights Batman and Superman attempting to revive Ra's al Ghul with a mystical Native American artifact.
 Talia appears in the Batman Beyond episode "Out of the Past", again voiced by Hussey. After assisting Bruce in thwarting her father's plan to destroy the world in "the near-apocalypse of '09", Talia willingly allowed her father's consciousness to possess her body. He impersonates Talia to manipulate the elderly Bruce Wayne into using the Lazarus Pit as part of a plot to transfer his consciousness to Bruce's reinvigorated body, but he is defeated by Terry McGinnis and seemingly killed after the Lazarus Pit explodes.

Live action
 The character has a cameo appearance as a child in season one of Legends of Tomorrow, portrayed by Milli Wilkinson.

 Talia al Ghul appears as a recurring character in the live-action series Arrow, portrayed by Lexa Doig. This version was Oliver Queen's mentor and later Adrian Chase's trainer. Introduced in season five, she appears in flashbacks, training Oliver in Russia, and in the present timeline, where she turns on Oliver for killing her father and teams up with Chase. In the season finale, Talia battles her sister Nyssa on Lian Yu and is defeated. When Chase commits suicide and triggers C4 bombs across the island, Talia's fate is left unknown until season seven which revealed that Talia survived thanks to a drug provided by Ricardo Diaz. After "running afoul of an old foe in Gotham", she is incarcerated at Slabside Maximum Security Prison where she is placed in Level 2. Under the "Demon" alias, Talia helps Diaz to order attacks on Oliver. After Oliver helps her escape, Talia delivers a USB drive with evidence of Jarrett Parker's illegal psychiatric activities to Felicity Smoak. As a result, Level 2 is shut down and Jarrett is fired. Talia later returns and kills Jarrett in revenge. After defeating the Thanatos Guild with the help of Oliver and Thea Queen, Talia tries to reclaim her place as the new "Ra's al Ghul" but loses it in a fight with Thea, which later convinces her that they should lead the group together and rebranding it as the "League of Heroes". In the series finale "Fadeout" taking place sometime after "Crisis on Infinite Earths", Nyssa reconciles with Talia at Oliver's funeral.

Films

Live action
 Film director George Miller expressed interest in casting Teresa Palmer as Talia al Ghul in the planned Justice League film Justice League: Mortal as a co-main antagonist alongside Maxwell Lord before the project was canceled.

The Dark Knight Trilogy

 Talia is mentioned in the bonus features of the DVD release for Batman Begins, under Ra's al Ghul's character info file. She is also alluded to in the film's novelization, though not by name.
 Marion Cotillard portrays Talia al Ghul in The Dark Knight Rises; Joey King and Harry Coles portrayed younger versions. Throughout most of the film, she appears under the alias Miranda Tate, a wealthy executive and philanthropist who gains Bruce Wayne's trust as Wayne Enterprises's CEO, and briefly becomes his lover. After Batman defeats Bane, Talia reveals that she is Ra's al Ghul's daughter and heir of the League's leadership, and that she dedicated herself to carrying out the dream of destroying Gotham after her father's demise and seeks revenge against Batman. The film further reveals that Talia was born in the underground prison "the Pit" and is a loyal friend to Bane who had protected her until she was able to escape. Batman and Selina Kyle pursue Talia as she drives a truck carrying an atomic bomb with which she intends to destroy the city, and Talia is mortally injured when she crashes her vehicle. She dies, believing that her mission is a success after destroying the reactor that can disable the bomb, but Batman ultimately foils her plot and saves Gotham City by carrying the bomb in the Bat over the bay to explode.

Animated
 Talia al Ghul appears in a non-speaking cameo appearance in a flashback of Batman: Under the Red Hood. Standing next to her father as she witnessed Jason Todd's return to life via the Lazarus Pit, which had made him mentally deranged and bloodthirsty adopting his darker, more vindictive "Red Hood" persona. She had tried to stop him from escaping by firing her gun, but was told to wait by her father as he went after the newly revived and deranged Jason.
 Talia al Ghul appears in Son of Batman, voiced by Morena Baccarin. During the movie's prologue, she leads the defense of the League of Assassins' base. Then, she brings her son Damian Wayne to Batman to help avenge his grandfather. Talia is captured soon after a failed attack on Deathstroke's base, attempting to regain full control of the League, and is subjected to torture. Later, Deathstroke uses the threat of killing her to make Damian come after him. In addition to her wounds from the torture, Talia is shot upon shielding Damian with her body. Batman later uses the nearby Lazarus Pit (around which Deathstroke's base was built) to revive her. At the end of the film, she argues with Damian's father who is better equipped to look after Damian. After Damian decides to remain with Batman, she departs with the intention of rebuilding the League.
 Talia al Ghul makes a cameo appearance in Batman vs. Robin in Bruce Wayne's nightmare as one of the thousands of victims he had ruthlessly murdered. Later on, Damian said how she, like his father Bruce Wayne and Ra's, was in his head, making him more confused on what to do and left to discover who he really is.
 Talia al Ghul returns in Batman: Bad Blood with Morena Baccarin reprising her role. Since last appearing in Son of Batman, Talia has abandoned any pretence of morality and relinquished her love for both Bruce Wayne and their child, seeing both primarily as tools to serve her purposes. Talia creates the Heretic (Damian Wayne's artificially full-grown clone) and recruits multiple super-villains like Blockbuster, Tusk, Calculator, Electrocutioner, Firefly, Hellhound, Killer Moth, and Mad Hatter. After capturing Bruce, Talia brainwashes him into becoming her loyal servant. Later, she has Bruce use Wayne Enterprise's new communication software to mind control the various political leaders of the world. Her efforts are ultimately stopped by the "Bat-Family" and Nightwing manages to help Bruce break free of Talia's reprogramming. Furious that she failed at both ambitions of controlling the world and having Bruce at her side, Talia retreats. She proceeds to escape on her jet, but is confronted inside by Onyx (who was looking for revenge on Talia for the Heretic's death) and counterattacks causing the jet to crash and leaving their fates unknown.
 Talia is seen in Batman vs. Teenage Mutant Ninja Turtles in an online file when the Ninja Turtles were looking on the information of Ra's al Ghul and his obtaining longevity via Lazarus Pits.
 Talia appears in three of the alternate storylines in the interactive film, Batman: Death in the Family, voiced by Zehra Fazal. If Jason cheated death after his assault from the Joker, he leaves Batman and takes on an identity similar to Hush. Talia appears and offers Jason the resources of the League of Assassins to help him track down the Joker in exchange from him agreeing to raise her and Bruce's illegitimate son Damian. Jason agrees, but secretly plans to turn Damian against both of his parents. If Batman sacrifices himself to save Jason, Talia resurrects him with the Lazarus Pit, though the process has driven Bruce insane in the process. She and Batman confront Jason as the Red Hood on top of Wayne Industries to get him to join them in the League, but Jason refuses and fights Batman. If Red Hood fatally stabs Batman, Bruce activates a bomb that kills all three of them. If Red Hood knocks out Batman without killing him, he defeats Talia shortly afterwards just as Dick Grayson arrives to take him and Bruce home.
 Talia al Ghul appears in Catwoman: Hunted, voiced again by Zehra Fazal. She is depicted as the leader of Leviathan and uses Cheetah as a proxy leader.

Video games
 Talia al Ghul appears in story sequences in the 1999 game Catwoman for Game Boy Color, in which she offers to pay Catwoman to steal an artifact from a museum, but Catwoman refuses, wanting it for herself.
 Talia al Ghul appears in several cinematics in Batman: Dark Tomorrow, voiced by Wendy Jones. She helps her father with his plans for world domination, but when Batman arrives to foil Ra's plan, she helps him by turning off the cameras around Ra's lair. Later, Ra's asks Batman to marry Talia and become his heir, but he refuses, much to Talia's disappointment. In the game's "good" ending (if Batman defeated Ra's and disabled his doomsday device), Talia leaves with Ubu and the deceased Ra's (who was accidentally killed by Ubu) when the lair begins to self-destruct, and revives her father using the Lazarus Pit. In both "bad" endings where Batman is defeated by Ra's, Talia holds him as he dies, while Ra's either commences his plan, or tells Batman that him disabling his weapon will only delay the inevitable, as it won't be long until the weapon is back online.
 Talia al Ghul appears in DC Universe Online, voiced by Ellie McBride. She is the "alert" broadcaster for the villain side.
 Talia al Ghul appears in Gotham Knights, voiced by Emily O'Brien. Following the deaths of Batman and Ra's al Ghul, the Gotham Knights run into Talia al Ghul who incinerates her father's corpse while claiming that the League of Shadows will make their move soon. In the Gotham Knights' later encounter with Talia, she mentions that the League of Shadows are enemies of the Court of Owls and that they plan to get rid of them by destroying Gotham City. Talia later assassinates the Court of Owls' leader Jacob Kane and reveals that she has manipulated the Gotham Knights into dismantling the Court of Owls. Upon the Gotham Knights following Talia to the ruins of Arkham Asylum, they find that she used the Lazarus Pit chemicals and Kirk Langstrom's research to create her mutated Man-Bats and use the Lazarus Pit beneath Gotham Cemetery to revive Bruce Wayne and mind-control him to be the new leader of the League of Shadows. The Gotham Knights break Bruce free of the brainwashing, but Talia gets away. Following Bruce's sacrifice to keep the Court of Owls from using the Lazarus Pit, Talia and the League of Shadows leave Gotham City.

Lego Batman series
 Talia al Ghul was a playable character in the Nintendo DS version of Lego Batman: The Videogame.
 Talia al Ghul appears as a playable character in the portable version of Lego Batman 2: DC Super Heroes.

Batman Arkham series
 Talia al Ghul is mentioned in Batman: Arkham Asylum in Ra's al Ghul's bio as Batman's love interest.
 Talia al Ghul appears in Batman: Arkham City, voiced by Stana Katic. This version serves as the head of Ra's al Ghul's squad of elite female assassins. She first appears in Wonder City, where she saves Batman from being killed by the assassins and leads Batman to Ra's. After Ra's is defeated by Batman, Ra's takes Talia hostage, and Batman saves her by throwing a reverse batarang at Ra's. When the Joker attempted to kill Batman when pinned by rubble, Talia rushes to the aid and offers immortality. Instead, Joker takes her hostage at the Monarch Theater and threatens to kill her unless Batman meets at the Monarch Theater, Batman then confronts Joker, allowing Talia to stab with her sword from behind while distracted. She then reveals that she has stolen the cure from Harley Quinn. However, she is killed by the real Joker, and Batman uses her sword to defeat Clayface.
 In Batman: Arkham Knight, Talia al Ghul's sword makes an appearance in the evidence room at the Gotham City Police Department. If Batman interacts with it, there is a quiet moment of reflection before Batman whispers "I'm sorry". Also, Batman's hallucinations from the Scarecrow's fear gas has the Joker making many references to Talia and that the Joker killed her, indicating that Batman at least believes her to be dead. During the Shadow War mission, a cold chamber with Talia's name can be found in the morgue of the Elliot Memorial Hospital taken as headquarters by the League of Assassins loyalists. It is ajar and empty, hinting that she may be alive.

Injustice series
 Talia al Ghul appears as an unplayable support card in the iOS and Android version of Injustice: Gods Among Us.
 Talia al Ghul is mentioned directly in Injustice 2 during Damian Wayne's various fight dialogues.

Miscellaneous
 Talia appears in issue #11 and #12 of the Young Justice tie-in comic book series, where she and her father attempt to hijack the launch of a Ferris Aircraft space shuttle only to be thwarted by Batman and Robin. When Batman tried to shut down the launch, Talia tried to stop him, but Batman told her she would have to shoot him to stop him. She and Sensei then later appeared at the end where Matt Hagen comes out of the Lazarus Pit as a slimy monster. It is revealed that a few months ago, she fell in love with Hagen, who claimed he loved her for who she was, not who her father was. But when Ra's blessed their relationship, Hagen reveals that he has cancer and was using her to get to the Lazarus Pit, so it would cure his cancer. Talia is heartbroken but allows him to get in, but once he is submerged in the Pit, Talia closes the hatch, trapping him inside, which transforms him into Clayface.
 Talia appears in Batman '66 Meets Wonder Woman '77.

References

External links

 Talia al Ghul on the DC Animated Universe Wiki

Batman characters
Characters created by Bob Brown
Characters created by Dennis O'Neil
Comics characters introduced in 1971
DC Comics female supervillains
DC Comics martial artists
Female characters in film
Female characters in television
Fictional Arabs
Fictional assassins in comics
Fictional cult members
Fictional female assassins
Fictional female businesspeople
Fictional female murderers
Fictional female swordfighters
Fictional marksmen and snipers
Fictional swordfighters in comics
Fictional women soldiers and warriors